

Administrative and municipal divisions

See also
Veps National Volost

References

 
Karelia, Republic of